Phil Savoy (born February 16, 1975) is a former American football wide receiver in the Arena Football League who played for the Nashville Kats. He played college football for the Colorado Buffaloes.

References

1975 births
Living people
American football wide receivers
Nashville Kats players
Colorado Buffaloes football players
Players of American football from Washington, D.C.